Jazmin Lopez (born 1984) is an Argentinian filmmaker. She was named one of the best new filmmakers of the 2010s by Richard Peña, Professor at the Columbia University School of the Arts. Her debut feature-length film, Leones (Lions), was reviewed in The New York Times, La Nación, Variety and Slant Magazine. Her subsequent films include Si yo fuera el invierno mismo (If I Were the Winter Itself) (2020).

Filmography 
 Leones (2012)
 Si yo fuera el invierno mismo (If I Were the Winter Itself) (2020)

References

External links 
 
 http://www.torinofilmlab.it/tfl-films-series/180-leones
 https://kadist.org/people/jazmin-lopez/
 https://www.frieze.com/article/untitled-12th-istanbul-biennial

Living people
Argentine film directors
1984 births
Argentine women film directors